was a Japanese politician from the Liberal Democratic Party, and a member of the House of Representatives in the Diet (national legislature). A native of Neyagawa, Osaka and graduate of Kansai University, he ran unsuccessfully for the House of Representatives in 2000. He became a member in July 2003 as proportional replacement from the LDP list in Kinki for deceased Tōru Okutani, in the November 2003 election he was elected for the first time. He ran for re-election in 2009 and was defeated by Shinji Tarutoko of the Democratic Party. Kitagawa recaptured his seat in the 2012 election and held it until his death from peritonitis on 26 December 2018.

References

External links
 Official website in Japanese.

1951 births
2018 deaths
People from Neyagawa, Osaka
Kansai University alumni
Members of the House of Representatives (Japan)
Liberal Democratic Party (Japan) politicians
21st-century Japanese politicians